International Correspondence Chess Grandmaster is a correspondence chess title created by FIDE in 1953, second only to that of world correspondence champion. Currently, this title is awarded by the International Correspondence Chess Federation (ICCF).

Argentina
 Roberto Alvarez, GM 1998
 David Beaumont, GM 2007
 German Benz, GM 2002
 Ruben Berdichesky, GM 199

 
 Jose Copie, GM 2000
 Gustavo Echeguren, GM 2003
 Liliana Susana Fredes de Locio, LGM 2010
 Roberto Jacquin, GM 2009
 Juan Sebastian Morgado, GM 1983
 Alfredo Mozzino, GM 2000
 Carlos Pappier, GM 1995
 Norberto Patrici, GM 1998
 Rodolfo Redolfi, GM 1994
 Alfredo Roca, GM 1999
 Hector Walsh, GM 2006

Australia
 Former world champion Cecil John Seddon Purdy, GM 1959
 Romanas Arlauskas, GM 1965
 Lucius Endzelins, GM 1959
 Chris Fenwick, GM 2007

Austria
 Tunç Hamarat, GM 1997
 Hermann Knoll, GM 2009
 Christian Muck, GM 2012
 Friedrich Rattinger, GM 2009
 Gertrude Schoisswohl, LGM 1997
 Dr. Harald Tarnowiecki, GM 1998
 Dr. Sven Teichmeister, GM 2002
 Wolfgang Zugrav, GM 2003

Belarus
 Dmitry Lybin, GM 2003

Belgium
 Jozef Boey, GM 1975
 Marc Geenen, GM 2000
 Valeer Maes, GM 1988
 Former world champion Alberic O'Kelly de Galway, GM 1962
 Christophe Pauwels, GM 2009
 Richard Polaczek, GM 1995

Bosnia and Herzegovina
 Jovan Kondali, GM 1986

Brazil
 Luis Almiron, GM 2010
 Sergio Badolati, GM 2010
 Reginaldo de Castro Cerqueira Filho, GM 2010
 Paulo Chacon, GM 2009
 Antonio Cipoli, GM 2009
 Carlos Costa, GM 2002
 Salvador Cresce, GM 2003
 Jose Goncalves, GM 2003
 Nevio Joao, GM 2005
 Rafael Leitão, GM 2012
 Joao de Oliveira, GM 2009
 Marcio de Oliveira, GM 2005
 Iluska Pereira da Cunha Simonsen, LGM 2000

Bulgaria
 Margarita Bocheva, LGM 2008
 Mladen Gudyev, GM 1991
 Valentin Iotov, GM 2012
 Sabina Karapchanska, LGM 2010
 Nikolai Ninov, GM 2000
 Georgi Popov, GM 1976

Canada
 Jonathan Berry, GM 1985
 Jean Hébert, GM 1984
 Robert Kiviaho, GM 1984
 Wolfram Schoen, GM 2006
 Duncan Suttles, GM 1982
 Alexander Ugge, GM 2005

Chile
 Guillermo Toro Solís, GM 1999

Croatia
 Pavao Keglević, GM 1978
 Davor Krivić, GM 2008
 Maja Zelčić, LGM 2005
 Leonardo Ljubičić, GM 2011

Cuba
 María de los Angeles Ynchauspi Leyva, LGM 2008

Czech Republic
 Marie Bazantova, LGM 2004
 Petr Boukal, GM 2017
 Libor Danek, GM 1999
 Jiri Dufek, GM 2012
 Roman Chytilek, GM 2004
 Vlasta Horackova, LGM 2005
 Karel Husak, GM 1968
 Jaroslav Hybl, GM 1968
 Jaroslav Ježek, GM 1985
 Milos Kratochvil, GM 2006
 Leonardo Ljubicic, GM 2011
 Jan Lounek, GM 2014
 Jiri Moucka, GM 2014
 Eva Mozna, LGM 1997
 Zdenek Nyvit, GM 2007
 Ludvik Pospisil, GM 2014
 Anna Ryvova, LGM 2003
 Rudolf Sevecek, GM 2000
 Alena Sikorova-Klosova, LGM 1997
 Kamil Stalmach, GM 2014
 Zdenek Straka, GM 2011
 Pavel Svacek, GM 2013
 Michal Tochacek, GM 2004
 Jaroslav Vaindl, GM 2004
 Jiri Vosahlik, GM 2009
 Davis Vrkoc, GM 2009
 Jindrich Zapletal, GM 1998 
 Jan Židů, GM 2011

Denmark
 Erik Bang, GM 1979
 Ove Ekebjaerg, GM GM 1987
 Niels Fries Nielsen, GM 1997
 Curt Hansen, GM 1999
 Jan du Jardin, GM 1999
 Allan Jensen, GM 1990
 Arne Jorgensen, GM 2002
 Martin Lohse, GM 2009
 Jens Nielsen, GM 2005
 Allan Poulsen, GM 2000
 Jørn Sloth, GM 1978
 Bent Sorensen, GM 1994

England
 Jill Barber, LGM 2005
 Anthony Barnsley, GM 2009
 John Brookes, GM 2001
 Ian Brooks, GM 2002
 Peter H Clarke, GM 1980
 Peter Coleman, GM 2004
 Richard Hall, GM 2002
 Adrian Hollis, GM 1976
 Maurice W. Johnson, GM 1995
 Mary E. Jones, LGM 2005
 Peter Markland, GM 1984
 Peter Millican, GM 1997
 Jonathan Penrose, GM 1983
 Nigel Povah, GM 1989
 Michael Prizant, GM 1996
 John Pugh, GM 2006
 Keith Richardson, GM 1975
 Nigel Robson, GM 2011
 Simon Webb, GM 1983

Estonia
 Alvar Kangur, GM 2007
 Raul Kukk, GM 2006
 Tõnu Õim, GM 1981
 Merike Rõtova, LGM 1997
 Jüri Siigur, GM 2011
 Tonu Tiits, GM 2009
 Svetlana Zainetdinova, LGM 2009

Finland
 Reijo Hiltunen, GM 1999
 Risto Kauranen, GM 1977
 Jaako Kivimäki, GM 1998
 Tero Kokkila, GM 1996
 Olli Koskinen, GM 1982
 Auvo Kujala, GM 1991
 Pertti Lehikoinen, GM 1985
 Asko Linna, GM 2006
 Georg Österman, GM 1994
 Pentti Palmo, GM 1980
 Heikki Pigg, GM 2007
 Auno Siikaluoma, GM 2012
 Kari Tikkanen, GM 1999
 Juhani Sorri, GM 1982

France
 Volf Bergraser, GM 1981
 Stephane Goerlinger, GM 2005
 Michel Lecroq, GM 1998
 Christophe Leotard, GM 2000
 Manuel Menetrier, GM 2002
 Jacqueline Roos, LGM 2000
 David Roubaud, GM 2014
 Robert Serradimigni, GM 2009
 Christophe Spitz, GM 2007

Germany
 Friedrich Baumbach, GM 1973
 Volker-Michael Anton, GM 1987
 Andreas Bachmann, GM 2001
 Gerd Branding, GM 2004
 Andreas Brenke, GM 2004
 Wolfgang Brodda, GM 2009
 Horst Broß, GM 2005
 Jürgen Bücker, GM 2009
 Heinrich Burger, GM 1996
 Annemarie Burghoff, LGM 2005
 Stephan Busemann, GM 1996
 Heinz-Wilhelm Dünhaupt, GM 1973
 Hans-Marcus Elwert, GM 1996
 Klaus Engel, GM 1983
 Ricarda Flügel, LGM 2008
 Frank Gerhardt, GM 2003
 Hans-Ulrich Grünberg, GM 1991
 Wolfgang Häßler, GM 1997
 Horst Handel, GM 1987
 Laura Hartmann, LGM 2009
 Hermann Heemsoth, GM 1987
 Paul Heilemann, GM 1984
 Knut Herschel, GM 1999
 Peter Hertel, GM 1999
 Hans-Joachim Hofstetter, GM 2003
 Siegfried Karkuth, GM 2006
 Heinz-Erich van Kempen, GM 1999
 Siegfried Kluve, GM 1998
 Klaus Kögler, GM 2007
 Martin Kreuzer, GM 1994
 Matthias Kribben, GM 2009
 Günther Kühnel, GM 2009
 Fred Kunzelmann, GM 2007
 Gerhard Löh, GM 1991
 Karl-Heinz Maeder, GM 1992
 Ralph Mallee, GM 1989
 Werner Metz, GM 1997
 Dieter Mohrlok, GM 1999
 Reinhard Moll, GM 2009
 Gerhard Müller, GM 2006
 Joachim Neumann, GM 2001
 Arno Nickel, GM 2001
 Manfred Nimtz, GM 1998
 Thomas Raupp, GM 2001
 Dieter Reppmann, GM 2005
 Horst Rittner, GM 1961
 Wolfgang Rohde, GM 2006
 Lothar Schmid, GM 1959
 Anja Schmidt, LGM 2005
 Frank Schröder, GM 2008
 Ingo Schütt, GM 1999
 Sandra Seidel, LGM 2010
 Christian Sender, GM 2002
 Mirna Siewert, LGM 2004
 Achim Soltau, GM 1993
 Claus Sprengelmeier, GM 2006
 Dieter Stern, GM 1985
 Werner Stern, GM 2009
 Günter Stertenbrink, GM 1984
 Maximilian Voss, GM 2003
 Robert K. Frhr. von Weizsäcker, GM 2004
 Thomas Winckelmann, GM 2004
 Hans-Dieter Wunderlich, GM 2006
 Hans Ziewitz, GM 1995

Guatemala
 César Augusto Blanco Gramajo, GM 2003

Hungary
 Gabor Glatt, GM 2002
 María Nemeth, LGM 2005
 Tamás Sasvarí, GM 2007

India
 Dhanish P. B., GM 2014

Italy
 Gabriel Cardelli, GM 2002
 Claudio Casabona, GM 2000
 Ettore D'Adamo, GM 2002
 Massimo De Blasio, GM 2001
 Fabio Finocchiaro, GM 1999
 Sante Giuliani, GM 2005
 Mario Napolitano, GM 1959
 Angelo Peluso, GM 1998
 Laura Piazza, LGM 2008
 Vittorio Piccardo, GM 2001
 Eros Riccio, GM 2010
 Alessandra Riegler, LGM 2005
 Luz Marina Tinjaca, LGM 2006
 Maurizio Tirabassi, GM 1999
 Bela Toth, GM 2004
 Elio Vassia, GM 2005
 Alberto Zanetti, GM 1997

Japan
 Sakae Ohtake, GM 2007
 Klyotaka Sakai, GM 2006

Kazakhstan
 Farit Gasisovich Balabaev, GM 2003

Latvia
 Maigonis Avotiņš, GM 2015
 Artis Gaujēns, GM 2004
 Aivars Gipslis, GM 1995
 Jānis Klovāns, GM 2001
 Ingrīda Priedīte, LGM 1998
 Olita Rause, LGM 1994 and GM 1998
 Vilnis Strautiņš, GM 2009
 Janis Vitomskis, GM 2001

Lithuania
 Vytautas Andriulaitis, GM 2001
 Vilma Dambrauskaite, LGM 2005
 Virginijus Dambrauskas, GM 2018
 Virginijus Grabliauskas, GM 2010
 Alfonsas Kupsys, GM 2011
 Donatas Lapienis, GM 1979
 Valentinas Normantas, GM 1995
 Giutautas Petraitis, GM 2010
 Pavel Rubinas, GM 2010
 Boris Rumiancevas, GM 1991
 Robertas Sutkus, GM 1998

Luxembourg
 Norbert Stoll, GM 2003
 Jean-Marie Weber, GM 2004

Mexico
 Jorge Aldrete Lobo, GM 2006
 Kenneth Frey, GM 2004

Netherlands
 Peter Boll, GM 1993
 Hans Bouwmeester, GM 1981
 Dick van Geet, GM 1991
 Carol-Peter Gouw, GM 2003
 David van der Hoeven, GM 2004
 Abram Idema, GM 1994
 Haije Kramer, GM 1984
 Jacques Kuiper, GM 2007
 Ron Langeveld, GM 2006
 Rudolf Maliangkay, GM 1994
 Karl Mulder van Leens Dijkstra, GM 1977
 Joop Oosterom, GM 1992
 Gerardus van Perlo, GM 1985
 Michail Plomp, GM 2000
 Hendrick Sarink, GM 1979
 Piet Seewald, GM 1992
 Dick Smit, GM 1979
 Gert Timmerman, GM 1986 
 Hans van Unen, GM 2007
 Tjalling Wiersma, GM 1985

New Zealand
 Mark Noble, GM 2010

Norway
 Olaf Barda, GM 1953
 Ivar Bern, GM 1997
 Raymond Boyer, GM 2003
 Arild Haugen, GM 2006
 Morten Lilleoren, GM 2007
 Peter Stigar, GM 1995
 Arne Vinje, GM 2001
 Terje Wibe, GM 1993

Peru
 Angel Acevedo Villalba, GM 2005

Poland
 Stefan Brzózka, GM 1985
 Jerzy Krzyston, GM 1992
 Jan Marcinkiewicz, GM 2006
 Maciej Nizynski, GM 2000
 Jacek Oskulski, GM 2018
 Rafael Pierzak, GM 2013
 Zygmunt Pioch, GM 1991
 Ryszard Skrobek, GM 1990
 Bogdan Sliwa, GM 1995
 Zbigniew Szczepanski, GM 2011

Portugal
 Horacio Neto, GM 2007
 Alvaro Pereira, GM 1994
 Francisco Pessoa, GM 2015
 Luis Santos, GM 1994
 Antonio Silva, GM 2009
 Joaquim Pedro Soberano, GM 2005

Qatar
 Mohamed Al-Thani, GM 1999

Romania
 Gheorghe S. Rotariu, GM 1981
 Paul Diaconescu, GM 1982
 Mihai Breazu, GM 1985
 Mariana Plass-Caravan, LGM 2003
 Florin Șerban, GM 2010
 Costel Voiculescu, GM 2012

Russia and Soviet Union

World Champions
 Yakov Estrin, GM 1966
 Vyacheslav Ragozin, GM 1959
 Grigory Sanakoev, GM 1984
 Mikhail Umansky, GM 1995
 Prof. Vladimir Zagorovsky, GM 1965
 Aleksandr Dronov, GM 2005

Other players
 Dmitry Barash, GM 1992
 Lyudmila S. Belavenets, LGM 1997
 Maksim Blokh, GM 1998
 Igor Bondarevsky, GM 1961
 Georgy Borisenko, GM 1966
 Piotr Dubinin, GM 1962
 Sergey Grodzensky, GM 1999
 Michail Judowitsch, GM 1972
 Abram Khasin, GM 1972
 Sergey Khlusevich, GM 1997
 Igor Kopylov, GM 1994
 Sergei Korolev, GM 1995
 Vsevolod Kosenkov, GM 1979
 Aleksei Mikhailov, GM 1983
 Oleg Moissev, GM 1977
 Igor Morozov, GM 1973
 Gennadi Nesis, GM 1985
 Lev Omeltschenko, GM 1986
 Irina V. Perevertkina, LGM 1999
 Nina G. Shchebenyuk, LGM 2006
 Olga M. Sukhareva, LGM 2006
 Lora G. Yakovleva, LGM 1997
 Tamara P. Zaitseva, LGM 2008

Scotland
 Douglas Bryson, GM 1986
 David Kilgour, GM 1985
 Andrew Muir, GM 1994

Serbia
 Matyas Berta, GM 1978
 Milan Jovcic, GM 1985
 Radovan Tomasevic, GM 1984
 Borislav Vukcevic, GM 1982

Slovenia
 Aleš BorŠtnik, GM 2012
 Franček Brglez, GM 1979
 Iztok Brunšek, GM 2010
 Leon Gostiša, GM 1998
 Danilo Korže, GM 2012
 Marjan Šemrl, GM 2007
 Jernej Šivic, GM 2012
 Boris Žlender, GM 1997

South Africa
 John Barlow, GM 2001

Spain
 Manuel Bescos Anzano, GM 2012
 Miguel Cánovas Pordomingo, GM 2011
 Carlos Cruzado Duenas, GM 2009
 P Drake Diez de Rivera, GM 2007
 Alberto González Freixas, GM 2005
 David Lafarga Santorroman, GM 2008
 Angel Manso Gil, GM 2013
 Joel Martin Clemente, GM 2008
 Jose Mercadal Benejam, GM 2002
 Francisco Javier Muñoz Moreno, GM 2012
 Carlos Rodríguez Amezqueta, GM 2014
 Francisco Vellila V. Velasco, GM 2008

Sweden
 Goran Andersson, GM 1991
 Ulf Andersson, GM 1996
 Eric Arnlind, GM 1968
 Arne Bjuhr, GM 2013
 Ingvar Carlsson, GM 1997
 Björn Fagerström, GM 2011
 Jan-Olof Forsberg, GM 2007
 Jonny Hector, GM 1999
 Tony Hedlund, GM 2005
 Rone Holmberg, GM 2002
 Rolf Lekander, GM 1992
 Franko Lukel, GM 2002
 Åke Lundqvist, GM 1962
 Harald Malmgren, GM 1959
 Jan Ohlin, GM 1990
 Dan Olofsson, GM 2000
 Conny Persson, GM 2004
 Lennart Rydholm, GM 2003
 Stefan Winge, GM 2011

Switzerland
 Phillippe Berclaz, GM 2004
 Ernst Eichhorn, GM 1990
 Gottardo Gottardi, GM 1995
 Christian Issler, GM 2004
 Rolf Knobel, GM 2003
 Matthias Rufenacht, GM 1992
 Rolf Scherer, GM 2011
 Wolfgang Standke, GM 2012
 Josef Steiner, GM 1973
 Anton Thaler, GM 2004
 Bela Toth, GM 2004

Turkey
 Murat Akaag, GM 2014
 Fatih Atakisi, GM 2010
 Tansel Turgut, GM 2007

Ukraine
 Alex Bubir, GM 2009
 Sergei Bibir, GM 2012
 Vladimir Dudyev, GM 2008
 Alexandr Gozman, GM 2006
 Svetlana Ignatchenko, LGM 1997
 Aleksey Lepikhov, GM 2002
 Nikolai Papenin, GM 2011
 Leonid Rubinchik, GM 1998
 Oleg Savchak, GM 2000
 Ivan Terelya, GM 2017
 Alexandr Volchok, GM 1993
 Alexandr Voyna, GM 1998

United States
 Hans Jack Berliner (deceased), GM 1968
 Vytas Victor Palciauskas, GM 1983
 Joseph DeMauro, GM 1997
 Alik Zilberberg, GM 1994
 John Timm, GM 2004
 Robin Smith (deceased), GM 2004
 Jason Bokar, GM 2007
 Daniel M. Fleetwood, GM 2008
 Jon Edwards, GM 2022

See also
 List of chess grandmasters

References

External links
International Correspondence Chess Federation
 https://web.archive.org/web/20120407032541/http://www.iccf.com/downloads/titles/2011_GM.pdf
 http://www.iccf.com/downloads/titles/2010_LGM.pdf

 
Chess titles
Correspondence chess
1953 in chess